Marco Stradiotto (born 7 October 1965) is an Italian politician.

Stradiotto was born on 7 October 1965 in Noale. He was elected to the Legislature XIV as a member of the Chamber of Deputies, serving from 2001 to 2006, while affiliated with The Daisy. Between 2008 and 2013, Stradiotto sat on the Senate for the Democratic Party.

References

1965 births
Living people
Deputies of Legislature XIV of Italy
Senators of Legislature XVI of Italy
Democratic Party (Italy) politicians
Democracy is Freedom – The Daisy politicians
Politicians from Venice